Daulia Ltd v Four Millbank Nominees Ltd [1977]  is an English contract law case, concerning unilateral contracts, and when embarking on the performance of an act for which an offer is open, at what point the offer may be withdrawn. In particular, Goff LJ observed that there would be a duty to not prevent full performance of terms in a unilateral offer, once performance had begun.

Facts
Daulia Ltd wanted to buy the premises on Millbank, London from Four Millbank Nominees Ltd, who were mortgagees in possession. Formal contracts were never exchanged, but Daulia argued they did obtain a unilateral contract by the first defendants that they would enter into a written contract of sale, if they attended Four Millbank's offices with a draft contract on terms already negotiated and a deposit. But when Daulia Ltd's representatives attended, Four Millbank refused to exchange. Daulia Ltd claimed breach of the oral agreement.

At first instance, Brightman J struck out Daulia Ltd's statement of claim for failing to comply with s.40(1) of the Law of Property Act 1925 (now, the requirement of form for contracts for interests in land under s.2, Law of Property (Miscellaneous Provisions) Act 1989). Daulia Ltd appealed.

Judgment
The Court of Appeal dismissed Daulia Ltd's appeal. They held there was a unilateral contract for disposition of land, and therefore it could not be effective because it did not comply with s.40(1). Furthermore there was no act of part performance, which could lead to a binding contract. In the course of his decision Goff LJ said that had there been part performance, it would be a duty of the offeror to not prevent full performance (see also, Errington v Errington). Goff LJ's judgment went as follows.

See also
Carlill v Carbolic Smoke Ball Co

References

English agreement case law
Court of Appeal (England and Wales) cases
1977 in case law
1977 in British law
Auction case law